Protea is a genus of flowers in the family Proteaceae.

Protea may also refer to:
 Protea (car), a motorcar build in South Africa during 1957 and 1958
 South Africa national cricket team, called "The Proteas"
 Proteas (rugby union), the representative side of the South African Rugby Football Federation in apartheid South Africa
 :Category:National sports teams of South Africa, officially nicknamed "the Proteas" (except the rugby union team and the soccer team)
 Protea (telephone), a South African telephone plug design
 9313 Protea, an asteroid, presumably named after the flower genus
 Protéa, the eponymous character played by Josette Andriot in a series of French silent espionage films made between 1913 and 1919
 , a survey vessel of the South African Navy commissioned in 1972 and still in service
 , a survey vessel commissioned in the South African Navy from 1947 to 1957
 , the first survey vessel commissioned in the South African Navy from 1922 to 1933
 Protea Hotels by Marriott, a hotel brand

See also 
 Protease, a class of enzyme
 Proteus (disambiguation)